Amity Shamende (born 4 August 1993) is a Zambian professional footballer who plays as a attacking midfielder for Green Eagles and the Zambia national football team.

References 
 

2001 births
Living people
Zambian footballers
Zambia international footballers
National Assembly F.C. players
Green Eagles F.C. players
Association football midfielders
Zambia A' international footballers
2020 African Nations Championship players